Ricuenio Kewal (born 6 June 2002) is a Dutch footballer who plays for Jong AZ.

Career
Having switched to AZ from Amsterdamsche FC as a youngster in 2015, Kewal earned a professional contract with AZ signing on 19 June 2021. Kewal made his professional debut in the Eerste Divisie against  Almere City in a 2-1 victory on 9 August 2021.

International career
Kewal has played for the Dutch under-16 national team.

Personal life
He is of Surinamese descent.

References

External links
 

Living people
2002 births
Dutch footballers
Eerste Divisie players
Jong AZ players